Joaquina Filipe Nhanala (born 1957) is a bishop in The United Methodist Church.   

Nhanala  was the first woman elected bishop by the Africa Central Conference of The United Methodist Church.

Nhanala received a Bachelor of Divinity from Limuru University and a Master of Bible Studies and Theology from Nairobi Evangelical Graduate School of Theology.

Nhanala serves the Mozambique Episcopal Area. She was elected in July 2008 and took office the following September.

References 

1957 births
Living people
Kenyan bishops